Brandval Church is a parish church of the Church of Norway in Kongsvinger Municipality in Innlandet county, Norway. It is located in the village of Brandval. It is one of the churches for the Brandval parish which is part of the Solør, Vinger og Odal prosti (deanery) in the Diocese of Hamar. The white, wooden, neo-gothic church was built in a cruciform design in 1651 using plans drawn up by the architect Erich Olsen. The church seats about 330 people.

History
The earliest existing historical records of the church date back to the year 1394, but it was not new that year. The first church in Brandval was a wooden stave church that was likely built during the 14th century.

The new church was a cruciform building was designed and built by Erich Olsen and Lauritz Lauritzen was in charge of the interior carpentry. The new building was consecrated in 1651. The church was restored in 1839. In 1876–1877, the church was remodeled under the leadership of Günther Schüssler. A new church porch and tower was built on the west end of the nave and the old small tower on the roof of the nave was removed. Also, new interior furniture was installed including the pulpit and altarpiece. In 1966–1967, much of the old furniture that was removed in 1877 was reinstalled after getting back from a museum.

Inventory
The baroque pulpit and altarpiece date from 1651. They were made by Lauritz Lauritzen and painted by Thomas Blix in 1728. The baptismal font is from the Middle Ages.

Media gallery

See also
List of churches in Hamar

References

Kongsvinger
Churches in Innlandet
Cruciform churches in Norway
Wooden churches in Norway
17th-century Church of Norway church buildings
Churches completed in 1651
14th-century establishments in Norway